Bohumil Kubrycht (born 27 July 1886, date of death unknown) was a cyclist. He competed for Bohemia at the 1912 Summer Olympics.

References

External links
 

1886 births
Year of death missing
Sportspeople from the Austro-Hungarian Empire
Olympic cyclists of Bohemia
Cyclists at the 1912 Summer Olympics
Sportspeople from Pardubice